Gloria Grey (born Maria Dragomanovich; October 23, 1909 – November 22, 1947) was an American screen and stage actress and director, appearing in mainly dramatic/romantic films during the silent era and after.

Career
Grey was born Maria Dragomanovich in Portland, Oregon in 1909. She was educated in San Francisco, California. Before beginning her career in film, Grey appeared onstage in vaudeville shows with the Gus Edwards Revue. Her career was spent chiefly during the 1920s in Hollywood, and the 1940s in Argentina. Her first film credit was the 1923 movie Bag and Baggage.

She was given praise for her starring role in the 1924 adaptation of Gene Stratton-Porter's A Girl of the Limberlost, which garnered her the honor of being selected as one of the WAMPAS Baby Stars in 1924. However, the film did little else to improve her career. She also appeared in an action serial titled Blake of Scotland Yard.

Grey appeared in 33 films during the 1920s, as well as five Spanish-language films made in Argentina during World War II, notably Back in the Seventies and Fragata Sarmiento.

Death
Grey was found deceased in bed at her mother's home in Los Angeles, California on November 22, 1947, having succumbed to a two-month bout of influenza. She was survived by her husband, magazine editor Ramón Romero, and their daughter. She is interred at the Westwood Village Memorial Park Cemetery in Los Angeles. She is resting by her husband, mother, and daughter.

Filmography

Notes

References

Bibliography

External links 

1909 births
1947 deaths
American expatriates in Argentina
American film actresses
American silent film actresses
American film directors
Actresses from Portland, Oregon
20th-century American actresses
Deaths from influenza
Expatriate actresses in Argentina
WAMPAS Baby Stars